Haydée Politoff is a Russian-French actress born on  in Paris.

Politoff moved to the United States in the late 1970s, retired from acting, and resided in California. 

"La Collectionneuse ended in Saint-Tropez. Just then the actress (Haydée Politoff) went to Italy and became a movie star for ten years and then married a British rock star and moved to San Francisco and may be living in America now, somewhere around Big Sur." — Patrick Bauchau

Filmography 
1966 : La Collectionneuse de Éric Rohmer
1967 : Ne jouez pas avec les Martiens de Henri Lanoë
1968 : Bora Bora de Ugo Liberatore
1968 : L'età del malessere de Giuliano Biagetti
1968 : The Young Wolves de Marcel Carné
1969 : Scacco alla regina de Pasquale Festa Campanile
1969 : Interrabang de Giuliano Biagetti
1969 : Les Allumeuses de Giuliano Biagetti
1970 : Secret intentions de Antonio Eceiza
1970 : Les Sorcières du lac de Tonino Cervi
1972 : La Vergine di Bali de Guido Zurli
1972 : Hector the Mighty de Enzo G. Castellari
1972 : Love in the Afternoon de Éric Rohmer
1973 : L'altra faccia del padrino de Franco Prosperi
1974 : El gran amor del conde Drácula (Count Dracula's Great Love)
1975 : La Guerre des otages de Edward Dmytryk
1979 : The Crying Woman  de Jacques Doillon
1981 : Il cappotto di legno de Gianni Manera
2018 : Rendezvous in Chicago by Michael Glover Smith

References

External links

 :it:File:Interrabang - Hayd%C3%A9e Politoff.png
 :it:File:Interrabang - Hayd%C3%A9e Politoff (2).png

French film actresses
1946 births
French women screenwriters
French screenwriters
Actresses from Paris
French television actresses
Writers from Paris
Living people
 French expatriates in the United States